1841 vote of no confidence in the Melbourne ministry may refer to two distinct events:

 June 1841 vote of no confidence in the Melbourne ministry
 August 1841 vote of no confidence in the Melbourne ministry